Paraleptophlebia vaciva is a species of pronggilled mayfly in the family Leptophlebiidae. It is found in southwestern Canada, the northwestern United States, and Alaska.

References

Mayflies
Articles created by Qbugbot
Insects described in 1884